Exhibition GO Station is a GO Transit railway station in Toronto, Ontario, Canada. The station is one of the Lakeshore West line stations between Toronto and Hamilton. It is located west of downtown Toronto at Exhibition Place, an area of convention and exhibition venues, sports facilities, and other entertainment attractions, restaurants and nightclubs. It is also on the south side of Liberty Village, a former industrial area which has been redeveloped into a residential neighbourhood with retail and restaurants.

Although the station is widely used during the Canadian National Exhibition, other major events and destinations at the Exhibition grounds include, Coca-Cola Coliseum, Enercare Centre, Medieval Times, Liberty Grand, BMO Field, Ontario Place, Budweiser Stage and Honda Indy Toronto.

Transit connections
Directly in front of the station there is a connection with Toronto Transit Commission buses on Dufferin route 29C and at the nearby Exhibition Loop with 511 Bathurst and 509 Harbourfront streetcar lines.

A suggestion was made in 2013 to integrate TTC and GO Transit fares so that riders from the adjoining Liberty Village neighbourhood would not have to pay full fare again when transferring between the GO train and TTC services. This proposal was also seen as a way to help ease rush hour congestion on the 504 King streetcar.

History

The original Grand Trunk Railway station consisted of a wooden frame building, located on the south side of the tracks just east of Dufferin Street. The grade separation, which was done between 1910 and 1912, resulted in the demolition of that station since it was necessary to build a retaining wall along the south side of the cutting. New Dufferin Gates were constructed at the entrance to Exhibition Place, with concrete stairs down to two side platforms west of the new bridge over the tracks. Passenger service continue to operate there until the 1960s.

Work to widen the platforms and add a snowmelt system, an accessible boarding area, and platform canopies began in the fourth quarter of 2012 and was completed in the second quarter of 2016.

Exhibition is the southwestern terminus of the proposed Ontario Line. The Ontario Line platforms will be north of the current Lakeshore West line tracks. The line is targeted for a 2030 opening.

References

External links

GO Transit railway stations
Railway stations in Toronto
Year of establishment missing